Jameel Kadhem (born 25 May 1971) is a Bahraini former cyclist. He competed in two events at the 1992 Summer Olympics.

References

External links
 

1971 births
Living people
Bahraini male cyclists
Olympic cyclists of Bahrain
Cyclists at the 1992 Summer Olympics
Place of birth missing (living people)